Le véridique de Gand was a French-language daily newspaper published in Ghent (United Kingdom of the Netherlands) from 25 November 1818 to 30 September 1820. It was printed and distributed by Pierre François De Goesin-Verhaeghe (1753–1831), printer to the newly established Ghent University, who had previously published Annonces et avis divers du département de l'Escaut.

References

External links
 Full text (1818) on Google Books
 Full text (1819) on Google Books
 Full text (1820) on Google Books

Publications established in 1818
Publications disestablished in 1820
Mass media in Ghent
Defunct daily newspapers